A by-election was held for the New South Wales Legislative Assembly seat of Drummoyne on 17 April 1982. It was triggered by the resignation of sitting Labor MP Michael Maher to contest the federal seat of Lowe at the 1982 by-election.

Dates

Results 

Michael Maher resigned.

See also
Electoral results for the district of Drummoyne
List of New South Wales state by-elections

References 

1982 elections in Australia
New South Wales state by-elections
1980s in New South Wales